Government of Georgia may refer to:
 Government of Georgia (country), an executive council of government ministers in the sovereign nation of Georgia, headed by the Prime Minister
 Government of Georgia (U.S. state), the government of the state of Georgia, in the United States